Mikhail Borisovich Terentyev (born 14 May 1970 in Krasnoyarsk, Russia) is a Russian Paralympian, member of parliament, and secretary-general of the Russian Paralympic Committee, and the European Paralympic Committee.

He is a multiple medal winner at the Paralympic Games in biathlon and cross-country skiing.

He is one of the members of the State Duma the United States Treasury sanctioned on 24 March 2022 in response to the 2022 Russian invasion of Ukraine.

References

External links
Official site (Russian)

1970 births
Living people
Paralympic biathletes of Russia
Biathletes at the 1994 Winter Paralympics
Biathletes at the 1998 Winter Paralympics
Biathletes at the 2002 Winter Paralympics
Biathletes at the 2006 Winter Paralympics
Paralympic cross-country skiers of Russia
Cross-country skiers at the 1994 Winter Paralympics
Cross-country skiers at the 1998 Winter Paralympics
Cross-country skiers at the 2002 Winter Paralympics
Cross-country skiers at the 2006 Winter Paralympics
Athletes (track and field) at the 2000 Summer Paralympics
Athletes (track and field) at the 2004 Summer Paralympics
Paralympic gold medalists for Russia
Paralympic silver medalists for Russia
Paralympic bronze medalists for Russia
Medalists at the 2006 Winter Paralympics
Medalists at the 2002 Winter Paralympics
Medalists at the 1998 Winter Paralympics
Russian male biathletes
Russian male cross-country skiers
Paralympic medalists in cross-country skiing
Paralympic medalists in biathlon
Fifth convocation members of the State Duma (Russian Federation)
Sixth convocation members of the State Duma (Russian Federation)
Seventh convocation members of the State Duma (Russian Federation)
Eighth convocation members of the State Duma (Russian Federation)
Russian individuals subject to the U.S. Department of the Treasury sanctions